From Broken Hearts to Blue Skies  is an album by Susannah McCorkle released in 1999.

Reception

Music critic Paula Edelstein of Allmusic praised the album and wrote "McCorkle's singing is straight from the heart and soul and she's clearly towering in blue skies as one of America's finest interpreters of the classic song."

Track listing
 "Laughing at Life" (Cornell Todd, Nick Kenny, Charles Kenny, Bob Todd) – 4:06
 "Something to Live For" (Billy Strayhorn, Duke Ellington) – 5:36
 "Look for the Silver Lining" (Jerome Kern, Buddy DeSylva, Susannah McCorkle) – 4:02
 "Nuages" (Django Reinhardt, Jacques Larue, McCorkle) – 5:00
 "Caminhos Cruzados" (Antonio Carlos Jobim, Newton Mendonça) – 4:26
 "I Wish I Were in Love Again" (Richard Rodgers, Lorenz Hart) – 3:59
 "I Ain't Gonna Play No Second Fiddle" (Perry Bradford) – 2:17
 "Losing Hand" (Charles Calhoun) – 5:40
 "I Want to Be a Sideman" (Dave Frishberg) – 4:44
 "Insensatez" (Jobim, Vinicius de Moraes, Norman Gimbel) – 2:06
 "A Phone Call to the Past" (Henry Mancini, Johnny Mercer) – 5:02
 "Stop, Time" (David Shire, Richard Maltby Jr.) – 4:17
 "Wave" (Jobim) – 4:09
 "Blue Skies" (Irving Berlin) – 3:20

Personnel
 Susannah McCorkle – vocals
 Allen Farnham – musical director, piano
 Greg Gisbert – flugelhorn (tracks 2, 3 & 6), trumpet (track 14)
 John Fedchock – trombone (tracks 2, 3, 6 & 14)
 Dick Oatts – tenor saxophone (tracks 5, 6, 8, 9, 13 & 14), soprano saxophone (tracks 2 & 3), alto flute (track 2)
 Al Gafa – acoustic guitar (tracks 2, 4, 5 & 13), electric guitar (tracks 1, 3, 6, 8. 9. & 14)
 Steve Gilmore – double bass (all selections except tracks 4, 10 & 12)
 Rich DeRosa – drums (all selections except tracks 4, 10 & 12)

All selections arranged by Allen Farnham, except "Something to Live For" and "Blue Skies" arranged by Rich DeRosa

References

1999 albums
Susannah McCorkle albums